Javad Shirzad (born September 20, 1982) is an Iranian football player. He plays for Malavan. He usually plays in the defender position.

Club career

Club Career Statistics
Last Update  30 April 2013 

 Assist Goals

Honours

Club
Iran's Premier Football League
Runner up: 1
2010/11 with Esteghlal
Hazfi Cup
Winner: 1
2011/12 with Esteghlal

External links
IPLStats.com

Iranian footballers
Iran international footballers
Persian Gulf Pro League players
Esteghlal F.C. players
Malavan players
Foolad FC players
Pas players
People from Bandar-e Anzali
1982 births
Living people
Association football fullbacks
Sportspeople from Gilan province